Houltonville is a populated place located in St. Tammany Parish, Louisiana at latitude 30.407 and longitude -90.142.
The elevation is 3 feet. Houltonville appears on the Madisonville U.S. Geological Survey Map. St. Tammany Parish is in the Central Time Zone (UTC -6 hours).

Populated places in St. Tammany Parish, Louisiana